Grundmannius dispar is a species of beetle in the family Carabidae, the only species in the genus Grundmannius.

References

Lebiinae